Cerina may refer to:

Places
Cerina, Brežice, a settlement in Brežice, Slovenia
Cerina, Croatia, a village in  Bjelovar-Bilogora County, Croatia

People with the given name
Cerina Vincent (born 1979), American actress and writer

People with the surname
Fabrizio Cerina, Italian investment banker
Igor Čerina (born 1988), Croatian footballer
 (born 1995), Croatian sports shooter